Ak (also known as Ak Kant and Āq Kant) is a village in Ak Rural District, Esfarvarin District, Takestan County, Qazvin Province, Iran. At the 2006 census, its population was 3,484, in 834 families.

References 

Populated places in Takestan County